Pseudovalsaria is a genus of fungi in the family Boliniaceae. The genus contains three species found in Europe and China.

References

Sordariomycetes genera
Boliniales